In architecture, a clerestory (also clearstory, clearstorey,  or overstorey) is a high section of wall that contains windows above eye level. Its purpose is to admit light, fresh air, or both.

Historically, clerestory denoted an upper level of a Roman basilica or of the nave of a Romanesque or Gothic church, the walls of which rise above the rooflines of the lower aisles and are pierced with windows.

Similar structures have been used in transportation vehicles to provide additional lighting, ventilation, or headroom.

History

Ancient world
The technology of the clerestory appears to originate in the temples of ancient Egypt. The term "clerestory" is applicable to Egyptian temples, where the lighting of the hall of columns was obtained over the stone roofs of the adjoining aisles, through gaps left in the vertical slabs of stone. Clerestory appeared in Egypt at least as early as the Amarna period.

In the Minoan palaces of Crete such as Knossos, by contrast, lightwells were employed in addition to clerestories.

According to Biblical accounts, the Hebrew temple built by King Solomon featured clerestory windows made possible by the use of a tall, angled roof and a central .

The clerestory was used in the Hellenistic architecture of the later periods of ancient Greek civilization. The Romans applied clerestories to basilicas of justice and to the basilica-like bath-houses and palaces.

Early Christian and Byzantine basilicas
Early Christian churches and some Byzantine churches, particularly in Italy, are based closely on the Roman basilica, and maintained the form of a central nave flanked by lower aisles on each side. The nave and aisles are separated by columns or piers, above which rises a wall pierced by clerestory windows.

Romanesque period
During the Romanesque period, many churches of the basilica form were constructed all over Europe. Many of these churches have wooden roofs with clerestories below them. Some Romanesque churches have barrel-vaulted ceilings with no clerestory. The development of the groin vault and ribbed vault made possible the insertion of clerestory windows.

Initially the nave of a large aisled and clerestoried church was of two levels: arcade and clerestory. During the Romanesque period, a third level was inserted between them, a gallery called the "triforium". The triforium generally opens into space beneath the sloping roof of the aisle. This became a standard feature of later Romanesque and Gothic large abbey and cathedral churches. Sometimes another gallery set into the wall space above the triforium and below the clerestory. This feature is found in some late Romanesque and early Gothic buildings in France.

The oldest glass clerestory windows still in place are from the late eleventh century, found in Augsburg Cathedral in Bavaria, Germany.

Gothic period

In smaller churches, clerestory windows may be trefoils or quatrefoils. In some Italian churches they are ocular. In most large churches, they are an important feature, both for beauty and for utility. The ribbed vaulting and flying buttresses of Gothic architecture concentrated the weight and thrust of the roof, freeing wall-space for larger clerestory fenestration. Generally, in Gothic masterpieces, the clerestory is divided into bays by the vaulting shafts that continue the same tall columns that form the arcade separating the aisles from the nave.

The tendency from the early Romanesque period to the late Gothic period was for the clerestory level to become progressively taller and the size of the windows to get proportionally larger in relation to wall surface, emerging in works such as the Gothic architecture of Amiens Cathedral or Westminster Abbey, where their clerestories account for nearly a third of the height of the interior.

Modern clerestory windows for energy-efficient buildings 
Modern clerestories often are defined as vertical windows, located on high walls, extending up from the roofline, designed to allow light and breezes into a space, without compromising privacy. Factory buildings often are built with clerestory windows; modern housing designs sometimes include them as well.

Modern clerestory windows may have another especially important role, besides daylighting and ventilation: they can be part of passive solar strategies, in very energy-efficient buildings (passive houses and zero-energy buildings).

To that end, clerestories are used in conjunction with stone, brick, concrete, and other high-mass walls and floors, properly positioned to store solar heat gains during the hotter parts of the day – allowing the walls and the floor to act as a heat bank during the cooler parts of the day.

Clerestories – in passive solar strategies – should be properly located (typically in the sunny side of the building) and protected from the summer's sun by rooflines, overhangs, recessed thick walls, or other architectural elements, in order to prevent overheating during the cooling season.

Transportation

Clerestory roofs were used on railway carriages (known as "clerestory carriages") from the mid-nineteenth century to the 1930s.

The first Pullman coaches in England had clerestory roofs, and were imported and assembled at Derby, where Pullman set up an assembly plant in conjunction with the Midland Railway, a predecessor of the London Midland and Scottish Railway (LMS). The first coach, a sleeping car named "Midland", was assembled and ready for trial-running in January 1874.

The last clerestory-roofed trains on the London Underground were the 'Q' stock, which were withdrawn from operation in 1971.

Clerestories were also used in early double-decker buses, giving better ventilation and headroom in the centre corridor, as well as better illumination.

The Volkswagen Type 2 Kombi, or Transport, commonly called the Microbus, came in a deluxe version with clerestory windows. VW made the Samba from 1961 to 1967 in several versions, which had as many as 23 windows, and it is highly prized by collectors.

The clerestory is known as "mollycroft roof", as well, especially in Romany and other caravans, e.g., vardos.

See also
 Säteritak, a Swedish roof style with a strip of clerestory-type of windows halfway up a hip roof
 Architecture of cathedrals and great churches
 Gothic architecture
 Passive daylighting
 Romanesque architecture
 Roof window

References

External links

 Clerestory coach (railway) images - nineteenth-century examples from more than 20 countries

Church architecture
Windows
Architectural elements
Energy-saving lighting
Sustainable building